Bert Maertens (born 16 November 1981 in Izegem) is a Belgian politician and is affiliated to the N-VA. He is replacing Geert Bourgeois as a member of the Belgian Chamber of Representatives from 2010 on.

References

1981 births
Living people
Members of the Chamber of Representatives (Belgium)
New Flemish Alliance politicians
People from Izegem
21st-century Belgian politicians